Girolles may refer to:

Girolles, Loiret, a commune in the French region of Centre
Girolles, Yonne, a commune in the French region of Bourgogne

See also
 Cantharellus cibarius fungus
 Girolle, a type of cheese knife